Mohammed Adamu may refer to:

 Mohammed Adamu (born 1961), Nigerian police officer, 20th Inspector General of Police
 Mohammed Adamu Aliero (born 1957), Nigerian politician
 Mohammed Adamu Ramadan (born 1975), Ghanaian politician

See also
 Adamu Mohammed (born 1983), Ghanaian footballer
 Gibril Adamu Mohammed (1961–2005), Ghanaian politician